was a town located in Yuri District, Akita Prefecture, Japan.

In 2003, the town had an estimated population of 5,880 and a density of 47.56 persons per km². The total area was 123.63 km².

On March 22, 2005, Yashima, along with the city of Honjō; and the towns of Chōkai, Higashiyuri, Iwaki, Nishime, Ōuchi and Yuri (all from Yuri District), merged to create the city of Yurihonjō.

External links
Yurihonjō official website 

Dissolved municipalities of Akita Prefecture
Yurihonjō